Azzan Maqbol (born April 24, 1984) is a Saudi Arabian professional footballer who plays as a midfielder.

References

External links 
 

Living people
1984 births
Saudi Arabian footballers
Najran SC players
Al-Nojoom FC players
Saudi First Division League players
Saudi Professional League players
Association football midfielders
Association football defenders